The JB Marks Local Municipality council consists of sixty-seven members elected by mixed-member proportional representation. Thirty-four councillors are elected by first-past-the-post voting in thirty-four wards, while the remaining thirty-three are chosen from party lists so that the total number of party representatives is proportional to the number of votes received. In the election of 1 November 2021 the African National Congress (ANC) narrowly lost their majority, winning thirty-three seats.

Results 
The following table shows the composition of the council after past elections.

August 2016 election

The following table shows the results of the 2016 election.

November 2021 election

The following table shows the results of the 2021 election.

References

JB Marks
Dr Kenneth Kaunda District Municipality